Aleksandra Perišić (born 2 July 2002) is a Serbian taekwondo practitioner. She won the silver medal in the women's welterweight event at the 2022 World Taekwondo Championships held in Guadalajara, Mexico.

She represented Serbia at the 2022 Mediterranean Games held in Oran, Algeria. She competed in the women's 67kg event where she was eliminated in her first match.

References

External links 
 

Living people
2002 births
Place of birth missing (living people)
Serbian female taekwondo practitioners
World Taekwondo Championships medalists
European Taekwondo Championships medalists
Competitors at the 2022 Mediterranean Games
Mediterranean Games competitors for Serbia
21st-century Serbian women